Charlotte Ellen Dean (born 22 December 2000) is an English cricketer who currently plays for Hampshire, Southern Vipers and London Spirit. An all-rounder, she is a right-handed batter and right-arm off break bowler. She made her international debut for the England women's cricket team in September 2021.

Early life
Dean was born on 22 December 2000 in Burton upon Trent, Staffordshire. She was introduced to cricket by her father. Her father, Steven, played cricket for Staffordshire and Warwickshire. She took five wickets on her debut for the Portsmouth Grammar School boys’ first XI in 2017, a year after captaining Hampshire Under-15s to victory in the Royal London County Cup.

Domestic career
Dean made her county debut in 2016, for Hampshire against Staffordshire. She hit her maiden county half-century later that season, scoring 54 against Essex. In 2017, she helped her side to promotion to Division 1 in the County Championship, scoring 206 runs at an average of 29.42, as well as taking 13 wickets, the most for the side. In 2018, Hampshire won Division 1 of the County Championship, with Dean contributing 163 runs, including her List A high score of 73 against Kent. She also took 4/4 against Gloucestershire that season, which at the time was her Twenty20 best bowling figures. In 2019, Dean scored 142 runs at an average of 20.28 and took 11 wickets at an average of 15.54 in the County Championship. She scored 95 runs and took 7 wickets at an average of 11.57 in the 2021 Women's Twenty20 Cup. 

Dean also played for Southern Vipers in the Women's Cricket Super League between 2017 and 2019. She played 7 matches across the three seasons, scoring 7 runs overall and taking 1 wicket, in 2017 against Lancashire Thunder.

In 2020, Dean continued playing for Southern Vipers in the Rachael Heyhoe Flint Trophy. She appeared in all seven matches as the side won the competition, scoring 180 runs at an average of 45.00 and taking 9 wickets at an average of 29.88. She scored 60* in the away match against Western Storm, and took 3/50 in the return match against the same team. In 2021, Dean played four matches in the Vipers' successful defence of the Rachael Heyhoe Flint Trophy, taking 10 wickets at an average of 13.80. She also played four matches in the Charlotte Edwards Cup, and took 5/19 in the first match of the tournament, which largely helped the Vipers bowl out Central Sparks for just 83. This was Dean's maiden five-wicket haul. She was also ever-present for London Spirit in The Hundred, scoring 44 runs and taking 6 wickets. At the end of the 2021 season, it was announced that Dean had signed a professional contract with Southern Vipers. In 2022, she was Southern Vipers' leading wicket-taker in the Charlotte Edwards Cup, with 12 wickets at an average of 8.25, as well as taking 5 wickets and scoring 49 runs in four matches in the Rachael Heyhoe Flint Trophy. In The Hundred, she became captain of London Spirit to replace the injured Heather Knight. She played all six matches for the side, scoring 38 runs but taking no wickets.

International career
In August 2021, Dean was named in England's Women's Twenty20 International (WT20I) squad for their series against New Zealand. However, Dean was ruled out of the first WT20I match after being identified as a possible COVID-19 contact. The following month, Dean was named in England's Women's One Day International (WODI) squad, also for the matches against New Zealand. She made her WODI debut on 16 September 2021, for England against New Zealand. She went on to be the joint-leading wicket-taker in the five-match series, with 10 wickets, including taking 4/36 in the 2nd ODI to help England to a 13-run victory.

In December 2021, Dean was named in England's squad for their tour to Australia to contest the Women's Ashes. She made her Women's Twenty20 International (WT20I) debut on 20 January 2022, for England against Australia, although the match was abandoned after 4.1 overs due to rain. She made her Women's Test match debut on 27 January 2022, for England against Australia in the one-off Women's Ashes Test. She dismissed Beth Mooney to claim her first Test wicket, and ended with figures of 2/24 in Australia's second innings. She also appeared in two of the WODIs on the tour, but failed to take a wicket. 

In February 2022, she was named in England's squad for the 2022 Women's Cricket World Cup in New Zealand. She played six matches in the tournament as England reached the final, and was the seventh-highest wicket-taker in the competition, with 11 wickets. She took her ODI career-best bowling figures in her second match of the tournament, taking 4/23 against India.

In July 2022, Dean was the leading wicket-taker in England's ODI series against South Africa, with 8 wickets at an average of 18.62. In September 2022, she played all three matches of England's ODI series against India, taking three wickets and scoring 108 runs. In the third ODI at Lord's, Dean made her ODI high score of 47 before being run out at the non-striker's end, the last wicket to fall with England short of their target by 17 runs. The following day, in the Rachael Heyhoe Flint Trophy final, Dean "playfully" pretended to recreate the run out whilst bowling. In November 2022, Dean was awarded with her first England central contract.

In December 2022, Dean was England's leading wicket-taker in both their ODI and T20I series against the West Indies, with seven and eleven wickets, respectively. She was also named Player of the Series in the T20I series. 
In January 2023, Dean was named in England's squad for the 2023 ICC Women's T20 World Cup. She played all five of England's matches at the tournament, taking four wickets at an average of 32.75.

References

External links

2000 births
Living people
Sportspeople from Burton upon Trent
England women Test cricketers
England women One Day International cricketers
England women Twenty20 International cricketers
Hampshire women cricketers
Southern Vipers cricketers
London Spirit cricketers